North-East Coolgardie was an electoral district of the Legislative Assembly in the Australian state of Western Australia from 1897 to 1901.

The district was located in the Eastern Goldfields. Its only  member was Frederick Vosper, who died towards the end of the parliamentary term. No by-election was held due to the imminence of the 1901 state election.

At 31 December 1898, the district bordered North Coolgardie to the north, Dundas to the west and south, and Coolgardie and East Coolgardie to the east. It included the settlements of Bulong, Kanowna, Broad Arrow, Black Flag, Paddington, Bardoc, Mulgarrie, and Kurnalpie.

Members

Election results

References

North-East Coolgardie